Elections were held in the Australian state of Queensland between 14 September 1868 and 6 October 1868 to elect the members of the state's Legislative Assembly.

Key dates
Due to problems of distance and communications, it was not possible to hold the elections on a single day.

See also
 Members of the Queensland Legislative Assembly, 1868–1870

References

Elections in Queensland
1868 elections in Australia
1860s in Queensland
September 1868 events
October 1868 events